An Taibhdhearc is the national Irish language theatre of Ireland. It was founded in 1928.

The word taibhdhearc appears as a gloss for the Latin teatrum (theatre) in an old Irish document, derived from roots meaning "dream" and "glance." The modern Irish for a theatre is amharclann.

An Taibhdhearc is situated at 19 Middle Street, within the medieval city of Galway. It is built on the ruins of the city's original Augustinian friary. The rear wall incorporates a wall from this friary, including some carved stone window frames.

The theatre is used for drama and music productions, and occasionally screens international films. The busiest period for the arts in Galway city each year is the two weeks of the annual Galway International Arts Festival.

Hiatus

After suffering extensive smoke damage during a fire in 2007, An Taibhdhearc closed its doors for an extended period of renovation and refurbishment.  While the theatre was closed, An Taibhdhearc continued to produce shows in other venues around Galway city and county. The theatre was re-opened by President of Ireland, Michael D Higgins, at a gala event in September 2012.

See also
Amharclann Ghaoth Dobhair
Bailte Seirbhísí Gaeltachta
Coiste Cearta Síbialta na Gaeilge
Gaeltacht
Líonraí Gaeilge
Údarás na Gaeltachta

References

External links
Official Website

Buildings and structures in Galway (city)
Culture in Galway (city)
Irish language
Theatres in the Republic of Ireland
Tourist attractions in Galway (city)
National theatres
Minority-language theatre